Adrian David Hugh Bivar, FRAS (abbreviated A.D.H. Bivar) (1926 - 2015) was a British numismatist and archaeologist, who was Emeritus Professor of Iranian Studies at the School of Oriental and African Studies, University of London. He specialized in Sasanian seals and rock reliefs, Kushano-Sasanian coins and chronology, Mithraic iconography, Arsacid history and pre-Islamic folklore. His written works include book chapters written for the Fischer Weltgeschichte (vol.16, 1966) and The Cambridge History of Iran (1983).

References

External links
 Bibliography of A.D.H. Bivar, in Bulletin of the Asia Institute, vol.7, Iranian Studies in Honor of A.D.H. Bivar (1993), pp. 5-8
 Obituary in Iran, Journal of the British Institute of Persian Studies, Volume 44, 2006 - Issue 1

Academics of SOAS University of London
British numismatists
British archaeologists
Iranologists
Living people
Presidents of the Royal Asiatic Society
Year of birth missing (living people)